Sir William Davidson Niven  (24 March 1842 – 29 May 1917) was a Scottish mathematician and electrical engineer.

After an early teaching career at Cambridge, Niven was Director of Studies at the Royal Naval College, Greenwich, for thirty years.

Life

Niven was born at Peterhead in Aberdeenshire, one of five notable mathematician brothers: Charles and James the best known. He graduated first from the University of Aberdeen, then from Trinity College, Cambridge, where he was a Wrangler and was elected a Fellow of his college. 

In 1882 Niven became Director of Studies at the Royal Naval College, Greenwich, succeeding Thomas Archer Hirst. He was appointed a Companion of the Order of the Bath (Civil division) in Queen Victoria's Diamond Jubilee Honours of 1897. He retired in 1903, when he was knighted by being appointed a Knight Commander of the Order of the Bath.

Niven was a colleague of James Clerk Maxwell (1831–1879), whose scientific papers he edited after his death. Among Niven's students was Alfred North Whitehead, to whom he taught mathematics, by instructing him in the physics of Maxwell.

In retirement Niven lived at Eastburn, Sidcup, Kent, where he died in 1917.

Major publications
Niven edited works by J. C. Maxwell:
 1881: A Treatise on Electricity and Magnetism, 2nd edition
 1890: The Scientific Papers of James Clerk Maxwell from Biodiversity Heritage Library

Notes

1842 births
1917 deaths
19th-century British mathematicians
Alumni of the University of Aberdeen
Alumni of Trinity College, Cambridge
Academics of the Royal Naval College, Greenwich
Fellows of Trinity College, Cambridge
Fellows of the Royal Society
Knights Commander of the Order of the Bath
People from Peterhead